The Indian Institute of Public Administration (IIPA) was established in 1954 and is research and training organization under the Ministry of Personnel of the Government of India.

References

1954 establishments in India
Educational institutions established in 1954
Government agencies established in 1954
Government agencies of India
Organisations based in Delhi
Research institutes established in 1954
Ministry of Personnel, Public Grievances and Pensions